is a Japanese mixed martial artist and professional wrestler. He was associated with Real Japan Pro Wrestling's Seikendo team.

Urita wrestled more famously under the name of Tiger Shark, and worked in promotions like Battlarts, Dradition Pro Wrestling, Tenryu Project and Riki Choshu's Legend The Pro Wrestling. Currently, he wrestles in Kazuki Okubo's Ganko Pro Wrestling and other independent promotions as Blue Shark.

Career

Early career
After several years training judo, Urita joined mixed martial arts organization Kingdom Ehrgeiz, where he was put under Hidetada Irie. Later, he moved to Satoru Sayama's Seikendo promotion, and in 2003 he had his MMA debut, submitting David Davitashvili. Thanks to a work agreement between Seikendo and Pancrase, Urita went to compete in the latter, fighting Keiichiro Yamamiya and Izuru Takeuchi to decision and knocking out Riki Fukuda. He also competed in a seikendo-rules MMA tournament in Sayama's Real Japan Pro Wrestling, winning the contest after three matches.

Real Japan Pro Wrestling (2005–2013)
In 2005, Urita started doing professional wrestling for Real Japan Pro Wrestling. He received the gimmick of Tiger Shark, a masked character with heel mannerisms conceived as Super Tiger II's dark counterpart, in a similar way to the historical Black Tiger and Tiger Mask. Tiger Shark wrestled under a blue mask with a shark design, contrasting with Super Tiger's silver and purple Tiger Mask attire, and had his first match teaming up with Masao Orihara against him and Hi69. Tiger Shark and Super Tiger wrestled each other in tag team matches during the next events, with Urita often teaming up with Orihara. However, he ended settling down in a tag team with Black Shadow, a similar character played by Makoto "Max" Miyazawa. They feuded with a coalition composed by Gran Hamada, Sammy Lee, Jr. and Kendo Nagasaki, as well as All Japan Pro Wrestling's Minoru.

In 2010, Shark broke his alliance with Masao Orihara, wrestling in a match in which Urita was defeated. After seldom apparitions in RJPW, Tiger Shark teamed again with Black Shadow to win the vacant RJPW Tag Team Championship, defeating Yujiro Yamamoto and Yuki Ishikawa. However, they had no defenses of the title, and they spent the next years feuding with Orihara. He also had a high-level match against New Japan Pro-Wrestling's Tiger Mask IV, being beaten. In September 2013, Tiger Shark had his last apparition in RJPW, teaming up with Tatsumi Fujinami to get a win over Super Tiger II and Riki Choshu.

Battlarts (2009–2011)
Tiger Shark started wrestling for shoot-style promotion Battlarts in 2009 as a RJPW representative. He participated in the B1 Climax 2009 Block A, facing star Yuki Ishikawa and Yuta Yoshikawa in losing efforts, though getting victories over Keita Yano and Ryuji Walter. As a result, he did not qualify. He continued appearing in Battlarts, teaming up with his long time rival Super Tiger II in a special tag team to feud with Ishikawa, as well as Bison Tagai. In 2010, the team broke up and Shark went free, staying with the promotion until its demise in 2011.

Tenryu Project and Legend The Pro Wrestling (2010–2013) 
Always working as a RJPW representative, Tiger Shark had his debut in Tenryu Project with his biggest career win, beating Dragon Gate top player Masaaki Mochizuki to win the Tenryu Project International Junior Heavyweight Championship. He retained it successfully against Hiroki, Dokuroman and Hikaru Sato, until he dropped it to Hiroki in a rematch. Around that time, Tiger moved to Riki Choshu's Legend The Pro Wrestling, where he teamed with a variety of Tiger-related characters, among them Super Tiger II, Original Tiger Mask and Black Tiger V. He also wrestled alongside Yoshiaki Fujiwara. In 2013, Tiger Shark and his allies entered in a feud with Atsushi Onita and his entourage, as part of the enmity between Onita and Original Tiger Mask from RJPW. Shark faced personally Onita's henchman Ichiro Yaguchi, with Urita coming victorious in a single match, his last apparition in the promotion.

Championships and accomplishments
Pro Wrestling A-Team
WEW World Tag Team Championship (1 time) – with Daisaku Shimoda
Real Japan Pro Wrestling
RJPW Tag Team Championship (1 time, inaugural, last) – with Black Shadow
RJPW vs. U-File Tournament (2012)
Tenryu Project
Tenryu Project International Junior Heavyweight Championship (1 time)
Independent circuit
Latin American Championship (1 time)
UWA Intercontinental Tag Team Championship (1 time, current) – with Takahiro Tababa

Mixed martial arts record

|-
| Win
| align=center| 14-12-2 (1)
| Gennadiy Kovalev
| KO (punch)
| FEFoMP: International Modern Pankration Championship
| 
| align=center| 1
| align=center| 3:35
| Vladivostok, Russia
| 
|-
| Win
| align=center| 13-12-2 (1)
| Gadji Zaipulaev
| Decision (unanimous)
| FEFoMP: Impact League 4
| 
| align=center| 3
| align=center| 5:00
| Khabarovsk, Russia
| 
|-
| Win
| align=center| 12-12-2 (1)
| Barry Guerin
| TKO (doctor stoppage)
| Square Jungle: Advent of Mr. MMA
| 
| align=center| 1
| align=center| 0:49
| Tokyo, Japan
| 
|-
| Win
| align=center| 11-12-2 (1)
| Sharihyar Abbasov
| TKO (doctor stoppage)
| GCM: Cage Force 11
| 
| align=center| 2
| align=center| 1:11
| Tokyo, Japan
| 
|-
| Loss
| align=center| 10-12-2 (1)
| Jerry Nelson
| Decision (majority)
| TF: Tenkaichi Fight 37
| 
| align=center| 3
| align=center| 5:00
| Chatan, Okinawa, Japan
| 
|-
| Loss
| align=center| 10-11-2 (1)
| Ryuta Sakurai
| Submission (armbar)
| Deep: 37 Impact
| 
| align=center| 1
| align=center| 3:22
| Tokyo, Japan
| 
|-
| Loss
| align=center| 10-10-2 (1)
| Vladimir Yushko
| Decision (unanimous)
| FEFoMP: World Pankration Championship 2008
| 
| align=center| 2
| align=center| 5:00
| Khabarovsk, Russia
| 
|-
| Win
| align=center| 10-9-2 (1)
| Hoon Kim
| TKO (punches)
| MARS 11: 2nd Anniversary
| 
| align=center| 2
| align=center| 1:41
| Tokyo, Japan
| 
|-
| Loss
| align=center| 9-9-2 (1)
| Yuya Shirai
| Submission (armbar)
| Deep: 31 Impact
| 
| align=center| 1
| align=center| 2:42
| Tokyo, Japan
| 
|-
| Loss
| align=center| 9-8-2 (1)
| Ichiro Kanai
| TKO (punches)
| Pancrase: Rising 5
| 
| align=center| 1
| align=center| 3:50
| Tokyo, Japan
| 
|-
| N/C
| align=center| 9-7-2 (1)
| Hoon Kim
| No contest (accidental low blow)
| MARS 7: Tornado Returns
| 
| align=center| 1
| align=center| 0:00
| Tokyo, Japan
| 
|-
| Win
| align=center| 9-7-2
| Alavutdin Gadjiev
| Decision (unanimous)
| FEFoMP: Asian Pankration Championship 2006
| 
| align=center| 2
| align=center| 5:00
| Khabarovsk, Russia
| 
|-
| Win
| align=center| 9-6-2
| Rikuhei Fujii
| Decision (unanimous)
| Pancrase: Blow 9
| 
| align=center| 2
| align=center| 5:00
| Tokyo, Japan
| 
|-
| Loss
| align=center| 8-6-2
| Marcelo Brito
| Submission (rear naked choke)
| MARS 4: New Deal
| 
| align=center| 1
| align=center| 4:44
| Tokyo, Japan
| 
|-
| Loss
| align=center| 8-5-2
| Hidemi Mihara
| Decision (unanimous)
| MARS: MARS Attack 1
| 
| align=center| 2
| align=center| 5:00
| Tokyo, Japan
| 
|-
| Win
| align=center| 8-4-2
| Ken Ogawa
| TKO (corner stoppage)
| MARS: MARS Attack 1
| 
| align=center| 1
| align=center| 1:43
| Tokyo, Japan
| 
|-
| Loss
| align=center| 7-4-2
| Arman Gambaryan
| Decision (unanimous)
| FEFoMP: World Pankration Championship 2006
| 
| align=center| 3
| align=center| 2:00
| Khabarovsk, Russia
| 
|-
| Draw
| align=center| 7-3-2
| Yuichi Nakanishi
| Draw
| Pancrase: Blow 3
| 
| align=center| 2
| align=center| 5:00
| Tokyo, Japan
| 
|-
| Win
| align=center| 7-3-1
| Riki Fukuda
| KO (punch)
| Pancrase: Blow 1
| 
| align=center| 1
| align=center| 0:40
| Tokyo, Japan
| 
|-
| Win
| align=center| 6-3-1
| Yuta Nakamura
| Decision (unanimous)
| RJPW: Legend Championship
| 
| align=center| 3
| align=center| 5:00
| Tokyo, Japan
| 
|-
| Win
| align=center| 5-3-1
| Toshihiro Hosoe
| Submission (armbar)
| RJPW: Legend Championship
| 
| align=center| 1
| align=center| 3:30
| Tokyo, Japan
| 
|-
| Win
| align=center| 4-3-1
| Motohiro Tachihara
| Submission (armbar)
| RJPW: Legend Championship
| 
| align=center| 1
| align=center| 3:36
| Tokyo, Japan
| 
|-
| Loss
| align=center| 3-3-1
| Izuru Takeuchi
| Decision (unanimous)
| Pancrase: Spiral 9
| 
| align=center| 2
| align=center| 5:00
| Tokyo, Japan
| 
|-
| Win
| align=center| 3-2-1
| Moriyuki Yamada
| Submission (guillotine choke)
| Pancrase: 2005 Neo-Blood Tournament Finals
| 
| align=center| 2
| align=center| 3:37
| Tokyo, Japan
| 
|-
| Draw
| align=center| 2-2-1
| Yuta Nakamura
| Draw
| RJPW: Roman Martial Arts 2005
| 
| align=center| 2
| align=center| 5:00
| Sendai, Miyagi, Japan
| 
|-
| Loss
| align=center| 2-2
| Valery Pliev
| Decision (unanimous)
| FEFoMP: Mayor Cup 2005
| 
| align=center| 3
| align=center| 5:00
| Khabarovsk, Russia
| 
|-
| Win
| align=center| 2-1
| Jin O Kim
| Decision (unanimous)
| Gladiator FC: Day 1
| 
| align=center| 3
| align=center| 5:00
| Seoul, South Korea
| 
|-
| Loss
| align=center| 1-1
| Keiichiro Yamamiya
| Decision (unanimous)
| Pancrase: Brave 5
| 
| align=center| 2
| align=center| 5:00
| Tokyo, Japan
| 
|-
| Win
| align=center| 1-0
| David Davitashvili
| Submission (guillotine choke)
| Seikendo: Dream Challenge
| 
| align=center| 2
| align=center| 3:18
| Tokyo, Japan
|

References

External links
 

1974 births
Living people
Japanese male mixed martial artists
Middleweight mixed martial artists
Mixed martial artists utilizing boxing
Mixed martial artists utilizing judo
Mixed martial artists utilizing wrestling
Japanese male professional wrestlers
Masked wrestlers
People from Yokohama
20th-century professional wrestlers
21st-century professional wrestlers
Tenryu Project International Junior Heavyweight Champions
WEW World Tag Team Champions